Lymantria nephrographa is a species of moth of the family Erebidae. It is found in the rainforests of the mid-east coast of Australia, including New South Wales and Queensland.

The wingspan is about 70 mm. The wings are white with red-brown zig-zag lines. The hindwings are powdered brown with usually a conspicuous centre spot. There is a row of black dots running along the edges of the forewings and hindwings.

External links
Australian caterpillars

Lymantria
Moths described in 1915
Moths of Queensland